Byron Sumner  (born 31 October 1991) is a former Australian rules footballer for the Sydney Swans in the Australian Football League (AFL).

Sumner was drafted to Sydney with the 54th selection in the 2009 AFL Draft.  He was recruited from Woodville-West Torrens in the South Australian National Football League.  He played in the opening round of the 2011 AFL season, but was delisted at the end of the season without playing another AFL game.  He returned to South Australian and continued to play for Woodville-West Torrens until he signed with Sturt Football Club for the 2017 SANFL season.

He is the brother of Gold Coast 2012 draft selection Tim Sumner and the uncle of former Sydney teammate Lewis Jetta.

References

External links

Living people
1991 births
Sydney Swans players
Woodville-West Torrens Football Club players
Indigenous Australian players of Australian rules football
Australian rules footballers from South Australia